Cyanoboletus is a fungal genus in the family Boletaceae. Circumscribed in 2014, it contains four species: C. flavosanguineus, C. rainisii, C. sinopulverulentus, and the type, C. pulverulentus. The generic name is derived from the Ancient Greek cyano ("blue"), referring to the deep ultramarine blue bruising reaction of the fruit bodies.

References

External links

Boletaceae
Boletales genera